The National Council of the Romanian National Minority is an institution which aims to maintain minority autonomy in the domains of culture, education, information and the official use of the Romanian language in Vojvodina, an autonomous province of Serbia where it is official at a provincial and local level, and which represents the Romanians in Serbia.

See also
 Libertatea (Pančevo)

References

External links

Romanians in Serbia
Organizations based in Serbia